The .22 Extra Long is a .22 in (5.6 mm) American rimfire rifle and handgun cartridge.

Description
Introduced around 1880, the .22 Extra Long was used in Remington, Ballard, Wesson, Stevens, and later (1916) models of Winchester's M1902 and M1904 single-shot bolt-action rifles, as well as in Smith & Wesson revolvers.

Using the same 40 gr (2.6 g) outside-lubricated bullet later adapted for the much more common .22 Long Rifle, the Extra Long was loaded with 6 gr (389 mg) of black powder. Originally, it slightly outperformed the .22 LR, but was "not noted for great accuracy", while later smokeless loads achieved about the same muzzle velocity as the .22 LR.

As with the .22 Winchester Automatic and  .22 Remington Automatic, the .22 Extra Long will not chamber correctly in .22 Long Rifle weapons. Because it is very dimensionally-similar, however, the shorter .22 Short, .22 Long, and .22 LR will chamber in weapons designed for it (in the same way a .38 Special cartridge can be loaded into a .357 Magnum revolver, or a .44 Special cartridge can be loaded into a .44 Magnum) revolver.

The power of the .22 Extra Long is comparable to the standard velocity .22 Long Rifle, which is much more commonly chambered and sold.

The .22 Extra Long ceased to be offered commercially in 1935.

See also
 .22 BB
 .22 CB
 .22 Short
 .22 Long
 .22 Long Rifle
 .22 Winchester Magnum Rimfire
 .22 Hornet
 List of rimfire cartridges
5mm caliber
List of cartridges by caliber
List of rifle cartridges
List of rimfire cartridges

References

Notes
Barnes, Frank C., ed. by John T. Amber. ".22 Extra Long", in Cartridges of the World, pp. 274, 282, & 283. Northfield, IL: DBI Books, 1972. .

Pistol and rifle cartridges
Rimfire cartridges